Serve Jah is the tenth album by Jamaican artist Luciano. It was released in 2003.

CD information
Format: Compact Disc (05464516572)
Stereo: Stereo
Pieces in Set: 1
Catalog #: 1657
Desc: Performer

Track listing
 I Will Survive      
 Serve Jah      
 Win Or Lose      
 Injustice      
 True Love      
 Hail King Selassie – (with Capleton)      
 Nowhere To Hide      
 Born Free      
 Long Story      
 Gideon Bus      
 House Of The Lord      
 I Am Not Sorry      
 Mankind

2003 albums
Luciano (singer) albums